The Bulgaria national women's beach handball team is the national team of Bulgaria. It takes part in international beach handball competitions. The team's greatest result came in 2006 when they won the Balkan Championship along with Semi-Final stage at the 2006 Beach Handball World Championships.

Competition Results
 Champions   Runners-Up   Semi-Finals

Balkan Championship

World Beach Handball Championships

External links
Official website
IHF profile

beach handball
Women's national beach handball teams